Verona Pooth (née Feldbusch; born 30 April 1968) is a German television personality, model, and occasional actress. In 1993, she was Miss Germany and Miss Intercontinental and represented Germany at the Miss Universe 1993 contest.

Early life

Pooth was born Verona Feldbusch in La Paz, Bolivia to German engineer Ernst Feldbusch and Bolivian hairdresser Luisa Feldbusch (1935–2015). Her parents were divorced in 1978. Pooth grew up with her mother in Hamburg, her father's hometown.

Career

Beauty pageants
Pooth took part in several beauty pageants in the 1990s. She won the finals of the following beauty contests: Miss Hamburg (1992), Miss Germany (1993), Miss Intercontinental (1993), and Miss American Dream (1995).

Film and television

Pooth hosted the erotic TV show Peep from 1996 to 1999 and her own late-night comedy talkshow Veronas Welt from 1998 to 2000. In 1998, she appeared in one episode of the US series Conan the Adventurer. Pooth made her film debut in Wer liebt, dem wachsen Flügel in 1998 and acted in several more movies in the 1990s and 2000s. She has dubbed certain cartoon characters since 2005, first time in the film Chicken Little.

Pooth presented the scripted reality TV shows The Swan – endlich schön! (2004) and Engel im Einsatz – Mit Verona Pooth (2008). She was part of the jury in the TV show Pool Champions – Promis unter Wasser (2013) and offered private insights into her family's life and education in the show 6 Mütter (2017).

Pooth received the German Bambi Award in 2004 and 2006.

Other ventures
In 1990, Pooth was asked to join the music group Chocolate, and performed the single "Ritmo de la noche".

She served as the spokesperson for several advertising campaigns on TV, such as for Telegate, Iglo, for the Expo 2000, and for KiK.

Pooth created her own fashion collections in Hamburg 1990 under the label Immerschön. From 2002 to 2004, she merchandised jewelry and lingerie under the label Veronas Dreams. Since 2007, she owns the cosmetic brand So ... perfect.

Personal life
In August 1996, Pooth married German entertainer and musician Dieter Bohlen. The marriage was dissolved in May 1997. In 2004, she married Franjo Pooth, a German entrepreneur. They have two sons, San Diego and Rocco Ernesto.

Filmography

References

External links

1968 births
Bolivian emigrants to Germany
German beauty pageant winners
German film actresses
German television actresses
German television presenters
Living people
Miss Universe 1993 contestants
People from La Paz
German women television presenters
German people of Bolivian descent